Krishan Imdika (born Saralanthi Pathiranage Krishan Imdika on July 6, 1976) was a Sri Lankan cricketer. He was a right-handed batsman and a left-arm medium-pace bowler who played for Colts Cricket Club. He was born in Gampaha.

Imdika made a single first-class appearance, during the 1998–99 season, against Matara. Batting in the lower order, he did not make an appearance in the first innings and scored a duck in the second.

External links
Krishan Imdika at CricketArchive 

1976 births
Living people
Sri Lankan cricketers
Colts Cricket Club cricketers